Bolesław Dubicki (16 September 1934 – 15 February 2004) was a Polish wrestler. He competed at the 1960 Summer Olympics and the 1964 Summer Olympics.

References

1934 births
2004 deaths
Polish male sport wrestlers
Olympic wrestlers of Poland
Wrestlers at the 1960 Summer Olympics
Wrestlers at the 1964 Summer Olympics
Sportspeople from Warsaw
20th-century Polish people
21st-century Polish people